Scott Gavin Erickson (born February 2, 1968) is a former Major League Baseball pitcher. He played for the Minnesota Twins, Baltimore Orioles, New York Mets, Texas Rangers, Los Angeles Dodgers, and New York Yankees over 15 seasons. He was a member of the  World Series champion Twins.

Early life 
Erickson was born in Long Beach, California. He was highly involved in sports during high school while he attended Homestead High School in Cupertino, California. He played baseball, soccer, football, and basketball. He was CCS Junior of the Year in baseball.

After completing his secondary education, he graduated from San Jose City College in 1988 with an AA degree in business. He was a Junior College 1st Team All American at San Jose. He then majored in accounting with a minor in psychology at the University of Arizona. Erickson was inducted into the Arizona Wildcat Hall of Fame after just one year of pitching at Arizona. Erickson set a school record for wins with an 18-3 record, as he led the country in wins (18), innings pitched (175), and complete games (14).  Those impressive numbers earned him a unanimous First Team All-American honor. His teammates at Arizona included Trevor Hoffman, Kevin Long, and J. T. Snow. In 1989, he played collegiate summer baseball with the Cotuit Kettleers of the Cape Cod Baseball League.

Career

Minor leagues 
Erickson began his professional career after being selected in the major league draft four times. He was drafted by the New York Mets in 1986 out of Homestead High School; the Houston Astros in 1987 and Toronto Blue Jays in 1988 out of San Jose City College; and in  he was drafted by the Minnesota Twins in the 4th round of the amateur draft out of the University of Arizona. He finally signed his first pro contract with Minnesota. After 27 minor league starts, Erickson rose to the major leagues in his second season of professional baseball with the Class AA Orlando Sun Rays. He was on a five-game win streak with a record of 8-3 in the first half as an All Star in the Southern League.

Major leagues

Minnesota Twins 
Erickson finished 1990 with a combined record of 16-7 between Double-A and the majors; he went 5-0 in September and tied Dave Stewart for American League Pitcher of the Month. In , Erickson posted a record of 12-2 with a 1.39 ERA in the first half season and was awarded the American League Pitcher of the Month for May and June. The Twins would go on to win the World Series, and Erickson finished second to Roger Clemens for the American League Cy Young Award and received votes for the American League Most Valuable Player Award.

The following season, Erickson started 32 games, going 13-12 with 5 complete games. He regressed the following year, however, leading the majors with 19 losses. On April 27, 1994, Erickson no-hit the Milwaukee Brewers 6-0 at the Hubert H. Humphrey Metrodome, the first no-hitter ever pitched in that stadium. He became the third Twins pitcher, after Jack Kralick in 1962 and Dean Chance in 1967, to pitch a no-hitter; the former's had been the last no-hitter in a Twins home game, that game having taken place at the Metrodome's predecessor, Metropolitan Stadium. Erickson's no-hitter was thought to be impossible on The Metrodome's artificial turf and home run reputation.

Baltimore Orioles 
In  he was traded to the Baltimore Orioles. Before being traded to Baltimore, Erickson was 4-6 with a 5.95 ERA for the Twins. After joining the Orioles, Erickson turned in 9 wins in 16 starts for Baltimore. Between both teams, he finished 13-10 with 7 complete games. In 1996, Erickson won 13 games for the second straight year with 6 complete games and 100 strikeouts for the 6th straight year. In 1997, Erickson turned in his best season since 1992, winning 16 games with a 3.69 ERA in 33 starts. He later signed a five-year, $32 million contract with Baltimore through . In 1998, Erickson once again won 16 games for the Orioles while leading the league in complete games (11) and innings pitched (251.1).

In 1999, Erickson went 15-12 with a 4.81 ERA while leading the league in shutouts (3). He also led the majors in ground balls induced with 454. On March 3, 2000, Erickson had bone chips removed from his elbow and was out of action eight weeks. Erickson made 16 starts for the Orioles in 2000. He was hampered by the nagging elbow issue and visited the disabled list twice, the second one being a season ending elbow injury. After over 2000 innings pitched, the elbow injury caused him to miss the entire 2001 season. Erickson returned in 2002, becoming the first pitcher to start Opening Day after missing an entire season. That season, he made 28 starts, pitching 160.2 innings.  In 2003, Erickson suffered a torn labrum and missed the entire 2003 season.

Later career 
In 2004, Erickson signed a minor league deal with the New York Mets. After two starts, he was traded to the Texas Rangers. He was in the starting rotation for the Los Angeles Dodgers in 2005. Erickson signed a deal with the New York Yankees on February 16, 2006. He was released by the Yankees on June 19 and retired from baseball at the beginning of the  season.

Pitching profile 
Erickson was a groundball pitcher. He led the league five times in most double plays in a season and is in the Top 5 in Major League history for groundball to flyout ratio.

Post-playing career
Erickson was the pitching coach for the Cleveland Indians Class A Advanced affiliate Carolina Mudcats of the Carolina League in 2012 and Mahoning Valley Scrappers of the New York–Penn League  He was also the President of MLM, majorleaguemechanics.com, a pitching mechanics tutorial with professional instruction. Beginning in 2015, he has been a game analyst for the Pac-12 Network.

Personal life 
In late 2000, Erickson was featured in People magazine's "50 Most Beautiful People" edition. Erickson was married to television personality, actress, and investigative reporter Lisa Guerrero until their divorce, with whom he founded HomeTeam Productions. They were executive producers for the 2008 movie A Plumm Summer.

On January 27, 2021, the Los Angeles County District Attorney's office charged Erickson with reckless driving in connection with a 2020 hit-and-run which killed two children. Prosecutors alleged that Erickson was racing with a woman, Rebecca Grossman when she struck and killed the two brothers in a Westlake Village, California crosswalk.

See also

 List of Major League Baseball annual wins leaders
 List of Major League Baseball career hit batsmen leaders
 List of Major League Baseball no-hitters

References

External links

1968 births
Living people
Arizona Wildcats baseball players
Baseball players from Long Beach, California
Major League Baseball pitchers
Minnesota Twins players
Baltimore Orioles players
New York Mets players
Texas Rangers players
Los Angeles Dodgers players
New York Yankees players
American League wins champions
Visalia Oaks players
Orlando Sun Rays players
Frederick Keys players
Bowie Baysox players
St. Lucie Mets players
Norfolk Tides players
Oklahoma RedHawks players
Las Vegas 51s players
Columbus Clippers players
San Jose City Jaguars baseball players
People from Cupertino, California
All-American college baseball players
Cotuit Kettleers players